Informatics Europe is the European association of university departments and research laboratories, in the field of informatics (also known as computer science).

Overview
Founded in 2006, Informatics Europe is a non-profit organization with head office in Zurich, Switzerland that has grown to represent over 160 members from 33 countries, connecting more than 20,000 researchers, promoting concerted positions and acts on shared priorities in the areas of education, research, knowledge transfer and social impact of informatics. Informatics Europe Members are institutes rather than individuals and include university departments of Informatics, Computer Science, Computing, IT, ICT as well as National Informatics Associations in Europe, public and private research labs and companies.

In addition, Informatics Europe liaises with scientific organisations such as the European Research Consortium for Informatics and Mathematics (ERCIM), the Association for Computing Machinery ACM) and the Computing Research Association (CRA).

History 
On 21 October 2005, the “1st European Computer Science Summit” brought together, for the first time, heads of Informatics and Computer Science departments throughout Europe. This landmark event was a joint undertaking of the Computer Science departments of the two branches of the Swiss Federal Institute of Technology: EPFL (Lausanne) and ETH (Zurich).

Besides the keynotes, talks, panels and workshops, the result of the Summit was the unanimous view that European computer scientists needed an organisation with aims and scope similar to those of the CRA in the US, extended — in light of the situation in Europe — to cover education as well as research. As a result, Informatics Europe was created with the aim to become the recognized voice of the European computer science community, including both universities and research centres.

Bertrand Meyer from ETH Zurich, one of the founding members of the organisation, served as its first President from 2006 to 2011. Carlo Ghezzi, Politecnico di Milano, was the second President from 2012 to 2015. Lynda Hardman, CWI / Utrecht University was the third President, serving from 2016 to 2017. The current President, Enrico Nardelli from Università di Roma 'Tor Vergata', took office in 2018.

Mission and Activities 
Informatics Europe is involved in a number of activities with the mission to foster quality research, education, and knowledge transfer in Informatics in Europe.

ECSS - European Computer Science Summit 
The European Computer Science Summit takes place once a year and offers a platform where leaders and decision makers in Informatics research and education in Europe gather to debate strategic themes and trends related to research, education and policies in Informatics.

Past Summits since 2005:

 ECSS 2021, hybrid event (Madrid, online)
 ECSS 2020, online event
 ECSS 2019, Rome
 ECSS 2018, Gothenburg
 ECSS 2017, Lisbon
 ECSS 2016, Budapest
 ECSS 2015, Vienna
 ECSS 2014, Wroclaw
 ECSS 2013, Amsterdam
 ECSS 2012, Barcelona
 ECSS 2011, Milan
 ECSS 2010, Prague
 ECSS 2009, Paris
 ECSS 2008, Zurich
 ECSS 2007, Berlin
 ECSS 2006, Zurich
 ECSS 2005, Zurich

Working Groups 
Informatics Europe fosters various working groups to shape strategic priorities within the European Informatics community. Each working group has thereby a focus on a specific topic or goal that is agreed on in the beginning of each year. The current groups are as follows:

 Data Collection and Reporting - aims at bringing forward solid, accurate facts and figures about Informatics research and education in Europe
 Ethics - Produces a summary report, outlining the possible approaches, the state of the art, and suggestions and guidelines for inclusion of topics related to ethics, responsibility and social impacts in Informatics university degree programs
 Informatics Education - aims at getting academia, industry, government and society together to influence education policy in Europe towards the full recognition and establishment of Informatics as a foundational discipline in schools
 Research Evaluation - examines all current changes and brings forward an updated set of recommendations for research evaluation in Informatics and closely related areas
 The Wide Role of Informatics at Universities - investigates what universities are doing to ensure that non-informatics teaching and research is informed by best practice in Informatics
 Women in Informatics Research and Education - promotes actions that help improve gender balance at all stages of the career path in Informatics.

Awards 
Each year, Informatics Europe presents two awards recognizing outstanding initiatives that advance the quality of research and education in Informatics in Europe.

The Best Practices in Education Award recognizes educational initiatives across Europe that improve the quality of Informatics teaching and the attractiveness of the discipline.

The Minerva Informatics Equality Award recognizes best practices in Departments or Faculties of European Universities and Research Labs that encourage and support the careers of women in Informatics research and education.

Services

Informatics Higher Education Data Portal 
The Higher Education Data Portal is a project of Informatics Europe created with the goal of providing members, the Informatics academic community, policymakers, industry and other stakeholders a complete and reliable picture of the state of Informatics (Computer Science, Computing, IT, ICT) higher education in Europe.  The full dataset, consisting of 8 years of data from over 20 countries (annually updated in October), is the only one of its kind in Europe. The focus on Informatics, and the central role played by data curation makes it unique, reliable and relevant.

Leaders Workshop 
Every year Informatics Europe organises a special Workshop for Leaders of Informatics Research and Education, as part of the ECSS global program, to address specific challenges they encounter in their role. The workshop is a unique networking forum for leaders of Informatics institutions and research groups, and focuses on concrete issues and practical solutions.

Informatics Job Platform 
The Informatics Europe Job Platform lists open scientific positions in Informatics (Computer Science, Computing, Computer Engineering, IT, ICT) and closely related fields and includes positions requiring a PhD degree or higher (e.g.: scientific researcher, post-doc, professor, etc.).

Department Evaluation 
The Department Evaluation is a service offered by Informatics Europe to assess research quality in Informatics, Computer Science and IT in university departments/faculties.

Informatics Research & Education Directory 
The Research & Education Directory includes institutions (faculties, departments, institutes, etc.) doing research and offering education in Informatics (Computer Science, Computing, Computer Engineering, IT, ICT) in Europe. The directory provides quick access to these institutions and to more detailed information presented by them.

Publications 

 Ethical/Social Impact of Informatics as a Study Subject in Informatics University Degree Programs (2019, Paola Mello, Enrico Nardelli)
 The Wide Role of Informatics at Universities (2019, Elisabetta Di Nitto, Susan Eisenbach, Inmaculada García Fernández, Eduard Gröller)
 Industry Funding for Academic Research in Informatics in Europe. Pilot Study (2018, Data Collection and Reporting Working Group of Informatics Europe)
 Informatics Education in Europe: Institutions, Degrees, Students, Positions, Salaries. Key Data 2012-2017 (2018, Svetlana Tikhonenko, Cristina Pereira)
 Informatics Research Evaluation (2018, Research Evaluation Working Group of Informatics Europe)
 Informatics for All: The strategy (2018, Informatics Europe & ACM Europe)
 When Computers Decide: Recommendations on Machine-Learned Automated Decision Making (2018, Informatics Europe & EUACM, joint report with ACM Europe)
 Informatics Education in Europe: Institutions, Degrees, Students, Positions, Salaries. Key Data 2011-2016 (2017, Cristina Pereira, Svetlana Tikhonenko)
 Informatics Education in Europe: Are We All In The Same Boat? (2017, The Committee on European Computing Education. Joint report with ACM Europe)
 Informatics in the Future: Proceedings of the 11th European Computer Science Summit (ECSS 2015), Vienna, October 2015 (2017, eds. Hannes Werthner and Frank van Harmelen, Springer Open)
 Informatics Education in Europe: Institutions, Degrees, Students, Positions, Salaries. Key Data 2010-2015 (2016, Cristina Pereira)
 Informatics Education in Europe: Institutions, Degrees, Students, Positions, Salaries. Key Data 2009-2014 (2015, Cristina Pereira)
 Informatics Education in Europe: Institutions, Degrees, Students, Positions, Salaries. Key Data 2008-2013 (2014, Cristina Pereira, Bertrand Meyer, Enrico Nardelli, Hannes Werthner) 
 Informatics Education in Europe: Institutions, Degrees, Students, Positions, Salaries. Key Data 2008-2012 (2013, Cristina Pereira and Bertrand Meyer)
 Informatics Education: Europe cannot Afford to Miss the Boat (2013, ed. Walter Gander, Joint report with ACM Europe)
 Informatics Doctorates in Europe - Some Facts and Figures (2013, ed. Manfred Nagl)
 Future of the European Scientific Societies in Informatics – Blueprint, 2011
 Future of the European Scientific Societies in Informatics - Extended panel report, 2011
 Future of the European Scientific Societies in Informatics - ECSS panel report, 2010
 Research Evaluation for Computer Science, 2008
 Student Enrollment and Image of the Informatics Discipline (2008, ed. Jan van Leeuwen and Letizia Tanca)
 European Computer Science Takes its Fate in its Own Hands (2005, Bertrand Meyer and Willy Zwaenepoel)

References

External links 
 Informatics Europe Website
 Informatics Europe Members
 Informatics Europe Board
 Informatics Europe Office
 ECSS
 Publications
 Informatics Europe Higher Education Data Portal

Computer science education
Computer science organizations
Higher education organisations based in Europe
International organisations based in Switzerland
Information technology organizations based in Europe
International research institutes
Pan-European learned societies